N-Train was a South Korean boy band, signed under MediaLine Entertainment. The group consisted of five members: Jungkyun, Seunghyun, Soul J, Yujin and Sangwoo.

History
Prior to debut, N-Train trained with their agency for three years. In hopes to break the idol group image of recording dance-type music, MediaLine Entertainment directed their attention in recording R&B and soul-oriented music instead.

N-Train debuted with a mid-tempo ballad song, "울면서 울어 (One Last Cry)", on May 27, 2011. In one of their music reviews, a staff writer from Allkpop complimented their debut single, noting that "N-Train will find most of their appeal is surprisingly through their singing, because boy is it good." The writer compared Jung Jung Kyun vocal ability to TVXQ's Max.

Members
 Seunghyun (승현)
 Jungkyun (정균)
 Soul J
 Yujin (유진)
 Sangwoo (상우)

Discography

Extended plays

Singles

Awards

References

External links
 

K-pop music groups
Musical groups established in 2011
Musical groups disestablished in 2013
Musical quintets
South Korean boy bands
South Korean contemporary R&B musical groups
2011 establishments in South Korea